The 2009 AIHL season was the tenth season of the Australian Ice Hockey League (AIHL). It ran from 25 April 2009 until 23 August 2009, with the AIHL finals following on 29 and 30 August 2009. The Newcastle North Stars won the H Newman Reid Trophy (backdated) after finishing the regular season first in the league standings. Adelaide Adrenaline won the Goodall Cup (backdated) for the first time by defeating the Newcastle North Stars in the final.

League business 
The 2009 season will be reduced to seven teams after the Central Coast Rhinos dropped out due to changes made in the licensing model. Two teams were renamed for the start of the season, Western Sydney Ice Dogs, dropped the Western part of the title to become the Sydney Ice Dogs and the Adelaide A's have been renamed for the start of the season, playing under the new name of Adelaide Adrenaline. The Sydney Ice Dogs have also been forced to relocate to 's Catholic Club's ice rink after their former home at  rink withdrew from the league.

On 25–26 July there was a week's break for the Junior Men's national tournament, known as the Brown Tournament.

Regular season 

|- bgcolor="#CCCCFF"
|Game No.||Home team||Score||Away team||Location||Date||Report
|- bgcolor="#FFFFFF"
|1||Sydney||6–1||Gold Coast||Liverpool||Saturday, 25 April|| 
|- bgcolor="#FFFFFF"
|2||Canberra||5–2||Bears||Canberra||Saturday, 25 April||
|- bgcolor="#FFFFFF"
|3||Newcastle||5–3||Sydney||Newcastle||Sunday, 26 April||
|- bgcolor="#FFFFFF"
|4||Bears||0–7||Gold Coast||Penrith||Sunday, 26 April||
|- bgcolor="#CCCCFF"
|Game No.||Home team||Score||Away team||Location||Date||Report
|- bgcolor="#FFFFFF"
|5||Melbourne Ice||3–4||Newcastle||Melbourne||Saturday, 2 May||
|- bgcolor="#FFFFFF"
|6||Bears||1–5||Sydney||Penrith||Saturday, 2 May||
|- bgcolor="#FFFFFF"
|7||Adelaide||7–3||Newcastle||Adelaide||Sunday, 3 May||
|- bgcolor="#FFFFFF"
|8||Sydney||2–3 SO||Canberra||Liverpool||Sunday, 3 May||
|- bgcolor="#CCCCFF"
|Game No.||Home team||Score||Away team||Location||Date||Report
|- bgcolor="#FFFFFF"
|9||Canberra||1–5||Melbourne||Canberra||Saturday, 9 May||
|- bgcolor="#FFFFFF"
|11||Newcastle||5–1||Gold Coast||Newcastle||Saturday, 9 May||
|- bgcolor="#FFFFFF"
|12||Sydney||6–1||Bears||Liverpool||Saturday, 9 May||
|- bgcolor="#FFFFFF"
|13||Newcastle||8–5||Gold Coast||Newcastle||Sunday, 10 May||
|- bgcolor="#FFFFFF"
|14||Bears||4–3 SO||Melbourne||Penrith||Sunday, 10 May||
|- bgcolor="#CCCCFF"
|Game No.||Home team||Score||Away team||Location||Date||Report
|- bgcolor="#FFFFFF"
|39||Gold Coast||2–3 SO||Newcastle||Gold Coast||Saturday, 16 May||
|- bgcolor="#FFFFFF"
|16||Adelaide||8–1||Canberra||Adelaide||Saturday, 16 May||
|- bgcolor="#FFFFFF"
|42||Gold Coast||4–5 SO||Newcastle||Gold Coast||Sunday, 17 May||
|- bgcolor="#FFFFFF"
|18||Melbourne||5–2||Canberra||Melbourne||Sunday, 17 May||
|- bgcolor="#FFFFFF"
|41||Bears||1–5||Sydney||Penrith||Sunday, 17 May||
|- bgcolor="#CCCCFF"
|Game No.||Home team||Score||Away team||Location||Date||Report
|- bgcolor="#FFFFFF"
|20||Gold Coast||8–4||Bears||Gold Coast||Saturday, 23 May||
|- bgcolor="#FFFFFF"
|21||Canberra||5–8||Newcastle||Canberra||Saturday, 23 May||
|- bgcolor="#FFFFFF"
|22||Melbourne||2–5||Adelaide||Melbourne||Saturday, 23 May||
|- bgcolor="#FFFFFF"
|23||Gold Coast||9–5||Bears||Gold Coast||Sunday, 24 May||
|- bgcolor="#FFFFFF"
|24||Melbourne||2–4||Adelaide||Melbourne||Sunday, 24 May||
|- bgcolor="#FFFFFF"
|25||Sydney||1–3||Canberra||Liverpool||Sunday, 24 May||
|- bgcolor="#CCCCFF"
|Game No.||Home team||Score||Away team||Location||Date||Report
|- bgcolor="#FFFFFF"
|26||Canberra||2–5||Newcastle||Canberra||Saturday, 30 May||
|- bgcolor="#FFFFFF"
|27||Melbourne||4–5 SO||Sydney||Melbourne||Saturday, 30 May||
|- bgcolor="#FFFFFF"
|28||Adelaide||8–3||Sydney||Adelaide||Sunday, 31 May||
|- bgcolor="#CCCCFF"
|Game No.||Home team||Score||Away team||Location||Date||Report
|- bgcolor="#FFFFFF"
|30||Gold Coast||4–2||Adelaide||Gold Coast||Saturday, 6 June||
|- bgcolor="#FFFFFF"
|31||Newcastle||7–3||Bears||Newcastle||Saturday, 6 June||
|- bgcolor="#FFFFFF"
|10||Canberra||2–5||Melbourne||Canberra||Saturday, 6 June||
|- bgcolor="#FFFFFF"
|33||Gold Coast||5–2||Adelaide||Gold Coast||Sunday, 7 June||
|- bgcolor="#FFFFFF"
|34||Bears||3–5||Melbourne||Penrith||Sunday, 7 June||
|- bgcolor="#CCCCFF"
|Game No.||Home team||Score||Away team||Location||Date||Report
|- bgcolor="#FFFFFF"
|35||Adelaide||4–2||Bears||Adelaide||Saturday, 13 June||
|- bgcolor="#FFFFFF"
|36||Canberra||6–3||Sydney||Canberra||Saturday, 13 June||
|- bgcolor="#FFFFFF"
|37||Melbourne||6–0||Bears||Melbourne||Sunday, 14 June||
|- bgcolor="#FFFFFF"
|38||Sydney||4–6||Newcastle||Liverpool||Sunday, 14 June||
|- bgcolor="#CCCCFF"
|Game No.||Home team||Score||Away team||Location||Date||Report
|- bgcolor="#FFFFFF"
|15||Gold Coast||9–2||Sydney||Gold Coast||Saturday, 20 June||
|- bgcolor="#FFFFFF"
|40||Adelaide||5–1||Canberra||Adelaide||Saturday, 20 June||
|- bgcolor="#FFFFFF"
|19||Bears||2–6||Newcastle||Penrith||Saturday, 20 June||
|- bgcolor="#FFFFFF"
|17||Gold Coast||8–4||Sydney||Gold Coast||Sunday, 21 June||
|- bgcolor="#FFFFFF"
|43||Melbourne||8–3||Canberra||Melbourne||Sunday, 21 June||
|- bgcolor="#CCCCFF"
|Game No.||Home team||Score||Away team||Location||Date||Report
|- bgcolor="#FFFFFF"
|44||Adelaide||5–2||Melbourne||Adelaide||Saturday, 27 June||
|- bgcolor="#FFFFFF"
|45||Newcastle||9–4||Canberra||Newcastle||Saturday, 27 June||
|- bgcolor="#FFFFFF"
|46||Sydney||4–1||Gold Coast||Liverpool||Saturday, 27 June||
|- bgcolor="#FFFFFF"
|47||Adelaide||1–4||Melbourne||Adelaide||Sunday, 28 June||
|- bgcolor="#FFFFFF"
|48||Bears||3–2 SO||Gold Coast||Penrith||Sunday, 28 June||
|- bgcolor="#FFFFFF"
|49||Newcastle||3–2||Sydney||Newcastle||Sunday, 28 June||
|- bgcolor="#CCCCFF"
|Game No.||Home team||Score||Away team||Location||Date||Report
|- bgcolor="#FFFFFF"
|50||Newcastle||3–4||Adelaide||Newcastle||Saturday, 4 July||
|- bgcolor="#FFFFFF"
|51||Canberra||1–4||Sydney||Canberra||Saturday, 4 July||
|- bgcolor="#FFFFFF"
|52||Melbourne||3–4 SO||Gold Coast||Melbourne||Saturday, 4 July||
|- bgcolor="#FFFFFF"
|53||Melbourne||5–4||Gold Coast||Melbourne||Sunday, 5 July||
|- bgcolor="#FFFFFF"
|54||Sydney||5–3||Adelaide||Liverpool||Sunday, 5 July||
|- bgcolor="#FFFFFF"
|29||Bears||2–7||Newcastle||Penrith||Sunday, 5 July||
|- bgcolor="#CCCCFF"
|Game No.||Home team||Score||Away team||Location||Date||Report
|- bgcolor="#FFFFFF"
|55||Melbourne||2–5||Newcastle||Melbourne||Saturday, 11 July||
|- bgcolor="#FFFFFF"
|56||Canberra||1–5||Gold Coast||Canberra||Saturday, 11 July||
|- bgcolor="#FFFFFF"
|57||Sydney||5–3||Bears||Liverpool||Saturday, 11 July||
|- bgcolor="#FFFFFF"
|58||Adelaide||5–7||Newcastle||Adelaide||Sunday, 12 July||
|- bgcolor="#FFFFFF"
|59||Canberra||1–3||Gold Coast||Canberra||Sunday, 12 July||
|- bgcolor="#CCCCFF"
|Game No.||Home team||Score||Away team||Location||Date||Report
|- bgcolor="#FFFFFF"
|60||Adelaide||9–3||Gold Coast||Adelaide||Saturday, 18 July||
|- bgcolor="#FFFFFF"
|61 & 62||Newcastle||3–7||Melbourne||Newcastle||Saturday, 18 July||
|- bgcolor="#FFFFFF"
|63||Adelaide||2–4||Gold Coast||Adelaide||Sunday, 19 July||
|- bgcolor="#FFFFFF"
|64||Bears||5–4 SO||Canberra||Penrith||Sunday, 19 July||
|- bgcolor="#FFFFFF"
|65 & 32||Sydney||3–5||Melbourne||Liverpool||Sunday, 19 July||
|- bgcolor="#CCCCFF"
|Game No.||Home team||Score||Away team||Location||Date||Report
|- bgcolor="#FFFFFF"
|66||Gold Coast||3–6||Canberra||Gold Coast||Saturday, 1 August||
|- bgcolor="#FFFFFF"
|67||Adelaide||7–3||Bears||Adelaide||Saturday, 1 August||
|- bgcolor="#FFFFFF"
|68||Gold Coast||5–1||Canberra||Gold Coast||Sunday, 2 August||
|- bgcolor="#FFFFFF"
|69||Melbourne||10–3||Bears||Melbourne||Sunday, 2 August||
|- bgcolor="#FFFFFF"
|70||Sydney||3–2||Newcastle||Liverpool||Sunday, 2 August||
|- bgcolor="#CCCCFF"
|Game No.||Home team||Score||Away team||Location||Date||Report
|- bgcolor="#FFFFFF"
|71||Newcastle||5–3||Adelaide||Newcastle||Saturday, 8 August||
|- bgcolor="#FFFFFF"
|72||Canberra||6–4||Bears||Canberra||Saturday, 8 August||
|- bgcolor="#FFFFFF"
|73 & 74||Bears||3–7||Adelaide||Penrith||Sunday, 9 August||
|- bgcolor="#CCCCFF"
|Game No.||Home team||Score||Away team||Location||Date||Report
|- bgcolor="#FFFFFF"
|75||Gold Coast||5–2||Melbourne||Gold Coast||Saturday, 15 August||
|- bgcolor="#FFFFFF"
|76 & 77||Canberra||1–6||Adelaide||Canberra||Saturday, 15 August||
|- bgcolor="#FFFFFF"
|84||Newcastle||5–3||Bears||Newcastle||Sunday, 23 August||
|- bgcolor="#FFFFFF"
|78||Gold Coast||4–9||Melbourne||Gold Coast||Sunday, 16 August||
|- bgcolor="#FFFFFF"
|79||Sydney||5–6 OT||Adelaide||Liverpool||Sunday, 16 August||
|- bgcolor="#FFFFFF"
|80||Newcastle||5–2||Canberra||Newcastle||Sunday, 16 August||
|- bgcolor="#CCCCFF"
|Game No.||Home team||Score||Away team||Location||Date||Report
|- bgcolor="#FFFFFF"
|81||Adelaide||1–3||Sydney||Adelaide||Saturday, 22 August||
|- bgcolor="#FFFFFF"
|82||Bears||6–4||Canberra||Penrith||Saturday, 22 August||
|- bgcolor="#FFFFFF"
|83||Melbourne||4–1||Sydney||Melbourne||Sunday, 23 August||

Note: "SO" indicates that a game was won through a shootout. Games schedule sourced from the AIHL.

Standings 

Source

Statistics

Scoring leaders 
List shows the ten top skaters sorted by points, then goals.

Leading goaltenders 
Only the top five goaltenders, based on save percentage.

Playoffs 

In 2009, the Goodall Cup, celebrating 100 years of existence, had been taken back from Ice Hockey Australia (IHA) for an amateur interstate tournament and was replaced by the AIHL with the newly commissioned AIHL Champions Trophy.

The 2009 playoffs was scheduled for 29 August 2009 with Championship final held on 30 August 2009. Following the end of the regular season the top four teams advanced to the playoff series which was held at Hunter Ice Skating Stadium in Warners Bay, Newcastle, New South Wales. The series was a single game elimination with the two winning semi-finalists advancing to the Championship final. The inaugural AIHL Champions Trophy was won by the Adelaide Adrenaline who defeated the Newcastle North Stars 3–2 in overtime after the two sides finished regulation time locked at 2–2. Adelaide's Cass Delsar, was named the finals most valuable player (MVP) after scoring the overtime winner.

In March 2010, the AIHL and IHA agreed to reinstate the Goodall Cup as the ultimate prize of the AIHL and backdated Adelaide Adrenaline's 2009 championship to the Goodall Cup (first title), etching the South Australian team's name on the cup and officially calling them the 2009 Goodall Cup champions.

All times are UTC+10:00

Semi-finals

Final

References

External links 
 Official website of the AIHL

AIHL season
Aihl
Australian Ice Hockey League seasons